Williams High School is a high school in Williams, Arizona. It is the only high school in the Williams Unified School District, which also includes a combined elementary and middle school.

Notable alumni
 Billy Hatcher, former MLB player (Chicago Cubs, Houston Astros, Pittsburgh Pirates, Cincinnati Reds, Boston Red Sox, Philadelphia Phillies, Texas Rangers)

External links
School district

References

Public high schools in Arizona
Schools in Coconino County, Arizona
Williams, Arizona
1904 establishments in Arizona Territory
Educational institutions established in 1904